The Appeal of the Independent Democrats (the full title was "Appeal of the Independent Democrats in Congress to the People of the United States") was a manifesto issued in January 1854, in response to the introduction into the United States Senate of the Kansas–Nebraska Bill. The Appeal was signed by then-prominent American politicians Salmon Chase, Charles Sumner, Joshua Giddings, Edward Wade, Gerrit Smith and Alexander De Witt.  Chase and Giddings were concerned that the bill repealed the Missouri Compromise, opening the proposed new territories of Kansas and Nebraska to slavery.

The Appeal stated:

Chase reviewed the history of the Missouri Compromise and argued that it had been accepted by the North only with the expectation that most of the remaining territory from the Louisiana Purchase would remain as free territory. Realizing that the Missouri Compromise was "canonized in the hearts of the American people", he called for both religious and political action in order to defeat the bill.

The Appeal was originally published in the Cincinnati Gazette and widely reprinted by other newspapers throughout the country.  Historian Eric Foner wrote, "Historians have tended to agree that the 'Appeal' was one of the most effective pieces of political propaganda in our history." Chase's description of an aggressive Slave Power came to be accepted in much of the North.

Historian Allan Nevins wrote that Chase's language was often "grossly exaggerated" and used as an example the claim that the bill would "permanently subjugate the whole country to the yoke of a slaveholding despotism." Nevins argued that the Appeal did much to arouse Southern resentment against the anti-slavery opponents of the bill.

By portraying the bill as pro-slavery aggression by Southerners against the North, it preempted Senator Stephen Douglas's planned justification of the measure as an embodiment of popular sovereignty and forced most Southern Whigs in Congress to support the measure.

The Appeal launched the "anti-Nebraska" movement, later organized into the Republican Party.

Background
The "Appeal of the Independent Democrats" was written on January 19, 1854. The entire document was written by: S. P. Chase, Charles Sumner, J. R. Giddings, Edward Wade, Gerritt Smith, and Alexander De Witt. The document was a response to the passing of a bill that wanted to organize the Territory of Nebraska. The men all banded together to write it, because they were strong believers that this bill should not have been passed. They provided what they thought were sufficient reasons as to why history showed that slavery was awful, and how the passing of the bill would only help slavery.

Notes

References
 Foner, Eric. Free Soil, Free Labor, Free Men: The Ideology of the Republican Party Before the Civil War. (1970) 
 Neely, Jr., Mark E. “The Kansas-Nebraska Act in American Political Culture: The Road to Bladensburg and the Appeal of the Independent Democrats,” in The Nebraska-Kansas Act of 1854, ed by. John R. Wunder and Joann M. Ross (U of Nebraska Press, 2008) pp 13-46.
 Nevins, Allan. Ordeal of the Union: A House Dividing 1852-1857. (1947)

External links
 "Appeal of the Independent Democrats." Teaching American History, teachingamericanhistory.org/library/document/appeal-of-the-independent-democrats/. Accessed 23 May 2017.
 Full text of the "Declaration" pp 144–52

  Appeal of the Independent Democrats

Works about American slavery
Republican Party (United States)
1854 in the United States
1854 documents